Malgioglio is a surname of Italian origin. Notable people with the surname include: 

 Astutillo Malgioglio (born 1958), Italian footballer
 Cristiano Malgioglio (born 1945), Italian composer and singer-songwriter

Italian-language surnames